Hofmann Spur is an ice-covered spur between Allison Glacier and Dale Glacier on the west side of the Royal Society Range, Victoria Land, Antarctica. It was named after David J. Hofmann of the University of Wyoming and the National Oceanic and Atmospheric Administration, who has conducted upper atmospheric research through high-altitude ballooning in Antarctica for over 15 years, contributing greatly to the understanding of the ozone hole.

References

Ridges of Victoria Land
Scott Coast